Elaine Burke is a former camogie player, captain of the All Ireland Camogie Championship winning team in 2005, remember for her catch-cry from the podium: "Rebels abú arís."

Career
She came to prominence at local level when she won the Carrighdoun under-14 camogie tournament competition two years in a row, 1994 and 1995. She won All Ireland senior medals in 2002, 2005  and 2006. She won Ashbourne Cup medals with UCC in 2000 and 2002.

Personal life
She graduated in law and retired when she commenced work with a firm of solicitors in Cork.  She moved to London for work and joined Tara Camogie Club 2012, winning Championship and reaching All-Ireland Junior Club semi final. Vice-Captain.

References

External links
 Camogie.ie Official Camogie Association Website
 Wikipedia List of Camogie players
 Tara Camogie London Tara Camogie London Website

Cork camogie players
Living people
1981 births
UCC camogie players